University of Lusaka (UNILUS) is a private university founded in 2007 in Lusaka, Zambia. It is a member of the Association of Commonwealth Universities.

Management 
UNILUS has three campuses in Lusaka, Zambia

Organisation
The University of Lusaka (UNILUS) offers a diverse range of unique Undergraduate and Postgraduate programmes with rich and relevant curricula designed to meet the ever changing needs of business, government and society. UNILUS schools include; Business and Management, Law Health Sciences and Education, Social Sciences & Technology. The university also has the School of Postgraduate studies which offer Masters and Doctorate programs. The university has two semesters in a year, the January and June semesters.
The University of Lusaka has over 30 undergraduate and postgraduate degree programmes. The University of Lusaka is divided into the following faculties:

School of Business and Management
 Bachelor of Science in Human Resource Management
 Bachelor of Science in Purchasing and Supply
 Bachelor of Accountancy
 Bachelor of Science Honours in Accounting and Finance
 Bachelor of Science in Marketing
 Bachelor of Business Administration
 Certificate in Innovation and Entrepreneurship
 Bachelor of Science in Economics and Finance
 Bachelor of Science in Banking and Finance
 Bachelor of Arts in Economics
 Bachelor of Science in Insurance and Pension Management
 Bachelor of Science in Actuarial Science
 Bachelor of Science in Logistics and Transport Management

School of Law
 Bachelor of Law

School of Medicine And Health Sciences     
 Bachelor of Science in Public Health
 Bachelor of Medicine and Surgery
 Bachelor of Medicine and Surgery (Pre-Med)
 Diploma in Registered Nursing

School of Education, Social Sciences and Technology
 Bachelor of Education in Educational Administration and Management
 Bachelor of Business Administration with Education
 Bachelor of Science in Real Estate Management
 Bachelor of Science in Politics and International Relations
 Bachelor of Science in Public Administration
 Bachelor of Art in Development Studies
 Bachelor of Science in Information Systems and Technology
 Bachelor of Science in Information Systems and Technology With Education

School of Postgraduate Studies
 MastersProgrammes
 Master of Science in Risk Management
 Master of Science in Public Finance and Taxation
 Master of Science in Logistics and Transport Management
 Master of Science in Insurance and Pensions Management
 Master of Business Administration In Banking and Finance
 Master of Business Administration With Education
 Master of Business Administration (Finance)
 Master of Business Administration
 Masters of Science in Auditing
 Master of Science in Accounting and Finance
 Master of Science in Marketing Management
 Master of Public Administration
 Master of Science in Project Management
 Master of Arts in Human Resource Management
 Master of Science in Economics and Finance
 Master of Science in Procurement and Supply Chain Management
 Master of Business Administration In Healthcare Management
 Executive MBA in Leadership & Wealth Creation
 Master of Arts in Educational Administration and Management
 Master Of Public Health
 Master Of Science In Environmental Management
 Master of Arts In Development Studies
 Master of Arts in Peace and Security Studies
 Master of Arts in Peace and Security Studies
 Master of Laws (LLM) / MPhil – Commercial and Corporate Law
 Master of Laws (LLM) / MPhil – Banking and Finance Law
 Master of Laws (LLM) / MPhil – Human Rights Law
 Master of Laws (LLM) / MPhil – Labour Law
 Master of Laws (LLM) / MPhil – Tax Law

PostGraduate Diploma Programmes
 Lecturing/Teaching Methodology for Lecturers
 Quality Assurance in Higher Education
 Supervision and Examination of Students Research Projects

PHD/Doctoral Programmes
 Doctor of Laws
 Doctor of Business Administration

References

External links
University of Lusaka website

Universities in Zambia
Education in Lusaka
Buildings and structures in Lusaka
Educational institutions established in 2007
2007 establishments in Zambia